Brenda Borg (born 1 May 1997) is a Maltese footballer who plays as a forward and has appeared for the Malta women's national team.

Career
Borg has been capped for the Malta national team, appearing for the team during the UEFA Women's Euro 2021 qualifying cycle.

See also
List of Malta women's international footballers

References

External links
 
 
 

1997 births
Living people
Maltese women's footballers
Malta women's international footballers
Women's association football forwards
Malta women's youth international footballers